Rhodobates is a genus of moths belonging to the family Tineidae. The genus was first described by Ragonot in 1895.

Species 
Rhodobates includes the following species:

 Rhodobates algiricella Rebel 1900
 Rhodobates amorphopa  Meyrick, 1938
 Rhodobates canariensis Petersen & Gaedike 1979
 Rhodobates emorsus Gozmány 1967
 Rhodobates friedeli Petersen 1987
 Rhodobates laevigatellus Herrich-Schäffer 1854
 Rhodobates nodicornella Rebel 1911
 Rhodobates pallipalpellus Rebel 1901
 Rhodobates paracosma Meyrick

References

Tineidae
Tineidae genera